Thomas Trauttmann (born 1 October 1991) is a French basketball player who plays for French Pro A League club SIG Strasbourg. He was born in Mulhouse.

See also
Basketball in France

References

French men's basketball players
Sportspeople from Mulhouse
1991 births
Living people
21st-century French people